Holy Family or Nativity is an oil on panel painting created by Lorenzo Costa, Italian painter of the Renaissance, around 1490. It was acquired by the Museum of Fine Arts of Lyon in 1892.

References

External links
La Nativité en gigapixel, Musée des Beaux-Arts de Lyon

1490s paintings
15th-century paintings
Paintings in the collection of the Museum of Fine Arts of Lyon
Costa
Paintings by Lorenzo Costa the Elder